Kishori Godbole  is a Marathi TV and film actress. She is the daughter of Marathi singer Jaywant Kulkarni. She is known for her role as Mrs. Vibhavari Suhaas Tendulkar in Mrs Tendulkar. She is also a well known theater actress of many plays. She played the character of Shobha in Sachin Pilgaonkar's TV series Hudd Kar Di, aired on Zee TV. Currently, she is playing Bayaza Maa in Sony TV's show Mere Sai - Shraddha Aur Saburi.

Television

Filmography

References

External links

Kishori Godbole at Bollywood Hungama

Living people
Actresses in Hindi cinema
Indian television actresses
Actresses in Marathi cinema
21st-century Indian actresses
Year of birth missing (living people)